The 1957 Colorado State Bears baseball team represented Colorado State College in the 1957 NCAA University Division baseball season. The Bears played their home games at Jackson Field. The team was coached by Pete Butler in his 15th year at Colorado State.

The Bears won the District VII playoff to advance to the College World Series, where they were defeated by the Arizona Wildcats.

Roster

Schedule 

! style="" | Regular Season
|- valign="top" 

|- align="center" bgcolor="#ccffcc"
|  || May 22 || at  || Falcon Baseball Field • Colorado Springs, Colorado || 13–3 || – || –
|- align="center" bgcolor="#ccffcc"
|  || May 25 || Air Force || Jackson Field • Greeley, Colorado || 8–6 || – || –
|- align="center" bgcolor="#ffcccc"
|  || May 25 || Air Force || Jackson Field • Greeley, Colorado || 5–11 || – || –
|-

|-
|-
! style="" | Postseason
|- valign="top"

|- align="center" bgcolor="#ccffcc"
| 28 || June 1 ||  || Jackson Field • Greeley, Colorado || 8–3 || 23–5 || –
|- align="center" bgcolor="#ffcccc"
| 29 || June 1 || Denver || Jackson Field • Greeley, Colorado || 3–4 || 23–6 || –
|- align="center" bgcolor="#ccffcc"
| 30 || June 3 || at Denver || Unknown • Denver, Colorado || 5–3 || 24–6 || –
|-

|- align="center" bgcolor="#ffcccc"
| 31 || June 8 || vs California || Omaha Municipal Stadium • Omaha, Nebraska || 0–4 || 24–7 || –
|- align="center" bgcolor="#ffcccc"
| 32 || June 9 || vs Notre Dame || Omaha Municipal Stadium • Omaha, Nebraska || 2–23 || 24–8 || –
|-

References 

Northern Colorado Bears baseball seasons
Colorado State Bears baseball
College World Series seasons
Colorado State
Rocky Mountain Athletic Conference baseball champion seasons